Gabriel Kennedy (born November 17, 1990) is an American businessman, chef, and TV host. He is the co-founder of Plant People, a cannabis company.

Early life and education
Kennedy was born in 1990 in Portland, Oregon. He graduated first in his class from The Culinary Institute of America and is a graduate of the Cornell University School of Hotel Administration. He is a Deans Distinguished Lecturer for the School of Hotel Administration.

Career
Kennedy started his career at 14 working in local Boulder restaurants and worked his way up to NYC establishments Bouley, and in 2015 as the visiting Executive Chef of Bon Appétit Magazine.

In 2015, Kennedy was named as ambassador of Concern Worldwide U.S.

In April 2015 in Haiti, Kennedy worked to provide food service and hospitality education.

In 2015, Kennedy won the third season of ABC's reality series The Taste.

In 2016, Kennedy hosted the Saturday morning cooking competition show on the CW network called Dinner Spinner.

In November 2016, Kennedy partnered with Taiwan's Tourism Bureau to explore the country’s cuisine.

In 2020, Kennedy was named in Forbes 30 under 30 in the food and drink category 

In 2021, Kennedy recently appeared on Selena Gomez's HBO cooking show, Selena + Chef.

Kennedy is a co-founder of Plant People, a cannabis wellness brand, which produces and sells herbal, mushroom and CBD-based supplements based in New York City. 

He also served as the culinary creative directory for The Little Beet and the Little Beet Table.

References 

Culinary Institute of America alumni
Cornell University School of Hotel Administration alumni
American television chefs
American male chefs
1990 births
Living people
Reality cooking competition contestants
Reality cooking competition winners
Television personalities from Portland, Oregon